Golf 2 or Golf II may refer to:

Vehicles
 Volkswagen Golf Mk2, a car
 Golf II, a type of Golf-class submarine

Video games
 Actua Golf 2
 Everybody's Golf 2
 Everybody's Golf Portable 2
 The second version of Outlaw Golf
 Super Swing Golf: Season 2